Victor Robert Hewlett Yarnell (October 5, 1919 – January 22, 2015) was a Canadian-born American politician who served as the Mayor of Reading, Pennsylvania, as a Democrat between 1968 and 1972.

Life
Yarnell was born on October 5, 1919, in Montreal, Quebec, Canada to an Irish father and an English mother.   He was educated in England as a boarder at Bedford Modern School after which he served in the British Army throughout World War II seeing action in Dunkirk and taking part in the Normandy landings.  After the war, Yarnell moved to the United States attending Albright College and later graduating M.A. from the University of Pennsylvania.

For the following twelve years Yarnell taught government at Muhlenberg High School until his election as a Democrat to the Pennsylvania House of Representatives in the 1963 session although deciding not to seek reelection to the House in 1964.  In 1968, Yarnell was elected 41st Mayor of Reading, Pennsylvania, an office he held until 1972.  Thereafter he continued community work in Reading as director of the Schuylkill River Green Association (1979-1997) and as a member of the board of trustees of Reading Area Community College.

Yarnell died in Reading, Pennsylvania, on January 22, 2015.  He was survived by his wife, Nancy, and a son.

References

1919 births
2015 deaths
Mayors of Reading, Pennsylvania
Democratic Party members of the Pennsylvania House of Representatives
University of Pennsylvania alumni
Albright College alumni
People educated at Bedford Modern School
Politicians from Montreal
Canadian emigrants to the United States
American people of English descent
American people of Irish descent
Educators from Pennsylvania
British Army personnel of World War II